Rexford Orotaloa (born 1956) is a Solomon Islands writer best known for the novel Two Times Resurrection and the story collection Suremada: Faces from a Solomon Island Village. His work often focuses on the conflict between modern and traditional culture.

References
The Pacific Islands: An Encyclopedia. By Brij V. Lal, Kate Fortune. University of Hawaii Press, 2000.

External links 
Robert Viking O'Brien's article on Two Times Resurrection from Ariel: A Review of International English Literature

1948 births
Solomon Islands novelists
Living people
Solomon Islands short story writers